Achatinella spaldingi is an extinct species of air-breathing land snail, a terrestrial pulmonate gastropod mollusk in the family Achatinellidae, now extinct. This species was endemic to Oahu, Hawaii.

References

†spaldingi
Extinct gastropods
Gastropods described in 1914
Taxonomy articles created by Polbot
ESA endangered species